Microsporidia are a group of spore-forming unicellular parasites. These spores contain an extrusion apparatus that has a coiled polar tube ending in an anchoring disc at the apical part of the spore.  They were once considered protozoans or protists, but are now known to be fungi, or a sister group to fungi. These fungal microbes are obligate eukaryotic parasites that use a unique mechanism to infect host cells.  They have recently been discovered in a 2017 Cornell study to infect Coleoptera on a large scale. So far, about 1500 of the probably more than one million species are named. Microsporidia are restricted to animal hosts, and all major groups of animals host microsporidia. Most infect insects, but they are also responsible for common diseases of crustaceans and fish. The named species of microsporidia usually infect one host species or a group of closely related taxa. Approximately 10 percent of the species are parasites of vertebrates —several species, most of which are opportunistic, can infect humans, in whom they can cause microsporidiosis.

After infection they influence their hosts in various ways and all organs and tissues are invaded, though generally by different species of specialised microsporidia. Some species are lethal, and a few are used in biological control of insect pests. Parasitic castration, gigantism, or change of host sex are all potential effects of microsporidian parasitism (in insects). In the most advanced cases of parasitism the microsporidium rules the host cell completely and controls its metabolism and reproduction, forming a xenoma.

Replication takes place within the host's cells, which are infected by means of unicellular spores. These vary from 1–40 μm, making them some of the smallest eukaryotes. Microsporidia that infect mammals are 1.0–4.0 μm. They also have the smallest eukaryotic genomes.

The terms "microsporidium" (pl. "microsporidia") and "microsporidian" are used as vernacular names for members of the group. The name Microsporidium Balbiani, 1884 is also used as a catchall genus for incertae sedis members.

Morphology 

Microsporidia lack mitochondria, instead possessing mitosomes. They also lack motile structures, such as flagella.

Microsporidia produce highly resistant spores, capable of surviving outside their host for up to several years. Spore morphology is useful in distinguishing between different species. Spores of most species are oval or pyriform, but rod-shaped or spherical spores are not unusual. A few genera produce spores of unique shape for the genus.

The spore is protected by a wall, consisting of three layers: 
an outer electron-dense exospore
a median, wide and seemingly structureless endospore, containing chitin
a thin internal plasma membrane

In most cases there are two closely associated nuclei, forming a diplokaryon, but sometimes there is only one.
The anterior half of the spore contains a harpoon-like apparatus with a long, thread-like polar filament, which is coiled up in the posterior half of the spore. The anterior part of the polar filament is surrounded by a polaroplast, a lamella of membranes. Behind the polar filament, there is a posterior vacuole.

Infection 
In the gut of the host the spore germinates; it builds up osmotic pressure until its rigid wall ruptures at its thinnest point at the apex. The posterior vacuole swells, forcing the polar filament to rapidly eject the infectious content into the cytoplasm of the potential host. Simultaneously the material of the filament is rearranged to form a tube which functions as a hypodermic needle and penetrates the gut epithelium.
 
Once inside the host cell, a sporoplasm grows, dividing or forming a multinucleate plasmodium, before producing new spores.  The life cycle varies considerably.  Some have a simple asexual life cycle, while others have a complex life cycle involving multiple hosts and both asexual and sexual reproduction.  Different types of spores may be produced at different stages, probably with different functions including autoinfection (transmission within a single host).

Medical implications 
In animals and humans, microsporidia often cause chronic, debilitating diseases rather than lethal infections. Effects on the host include reduced longevity, fertility, weight, and general vigor. Vertical transmission of microsporidia is frequently reported. 

In the case of insect hosts, vertical transmission often occurs as transovarial transmission, where the microsporidian parasites pass from the ovaries of the female host into eggs and eventually multiply in the infected larvae.  Amblyospora salinaria n. sp. which infects the mosquito Culex salinarius Coquillett, and Amblyospora californica which infects the mosquito Culex tarsalis Coquillett, provide typical examples of transovarial transmission of microsporidia. Microsporidia, specifically the mosquito-infecting Vavraia culicis, are being explored as a possible 'evolution-proof' malaria-control method. Microsporidian infection of Anopheles gambiae (the principal vector of Plasmodium falciparum malaria) reduces malarial infection within the mosquito, and shortens the mosquito lifespan. As the majority of malaria-infected mosquitoes naturally die before the malaria parasite is mature enough to transmit, any increase in mosquito mortality through microsporidian-infection may reduce malaria transmission to humans. In May 2020, researchers reported that Microsporidia MB, a symbiont in the midgut and ovaries of An. arabiensis, significantly impaired transmission of P. falciparum, had "no overt effect" on the fitness of host mosquitoes, and was transmitted vertically (through inheritance).

Clinical

Microsporidian infections of humans sometimes cause a disease called microsporidiosis. At least 14 microsporidian species, spread across eight genera, have been recognized as human pathogens. These include Trachipleistophora hominis.

As hyperparasites

Microsporidia can infect a variety of hosts, including hosts which are themselves parasites. In that case, the microsporidian species is a hyperparasite, i.e. a parasite of a parasite. As an example, more than eighteen species are known which parasitize digeneans (parasitic flatworms). These digeneans are themselves parasites in various vertebrates and molluscs. Eight of these species belong to the genus Nosema. Similarly, the microsporidian species Toguebayea baccigeri is a parasite of a digenean, the faustulid Bacciger israelensis, itself an intestinal parasite of a marine fish, the bogue Boops boops (Teleostei, Sparidae).

Genomes
Microsporidia have the smallest known (nuclear) eukaryotic genomes. The parasitic lifestyle of microsporidia has led to a loss of many mitochondrial and Golgi genes, and even their ribosomal RNAs are reduced in size compared with those of most eukaryotes. As a consequence, the genomes of microsporidia are much smaller than those of other eukaryotes. Currently known microsporidial genomes are 2.5 to 11.6 Mb in size, encoding from 1,848 to 3,266 proteins which is in the same range as many bacteria.

Horizontal gene transfer (HGT) seems to have occurred many times in microsporidia. For instance, the genomes of Encephalitozoon romaleae and Trachipleistophora hominis contain genes that derive from animals and bacteria, and some even from fungi.

Classification 

The first described microsporidian genus, Nosema, was initially put by Nägeli in the fungal group Schizomycetes together with some bacteria and yeasts. For some time microsporidia were considered as very primitive eukaryotes, placed in the protozoan group Cnidospora. Later, especially because of the lack of mitochondria, they were placed along with the other Protozoa such as diplomonads, parabasalids and archamoebae in the protozoan-group Archezoa. More recent research has falsified this theory of early origin (for all of these). Instead, microsporidia are proposed to be highly developed and specialized organisms, which just dispensed functions that are needed no longer, because they are supplied by the host. Furthermore, spore-forming organisms in general do have a complex system of reproduction, both sexual and asexual, which look far from primitive.

Since the mid-2000s microsporidia are placed within the Fungi or as a sister-group of the Fungi with a common ancestor.

Work to identify clades is largely based on habitat and host. Three classes of Microsporidia are proposed by Vossbrinck and Debrunner-Vossbrinck, based on the habitat: Aquasporidia, Marinosporidia and Terresporidia.

A second classification by Cavalier-Smith 1993:
 Subphyla Rudimicrospora Cavalier-Smith 1993
 Class Minisporea Cavalier-Smith 1993
 Order Minisporida Sprague, 1972
 Class Metchnikovellea Weiser, 1977
 Order Metchnikovellida Vivier, 1975
 Subphyla Polaroplasta Cavalier-Smith 1993
 Class Pleistophoridea Cavalier-Smith 1993
 Order Pleistophorida Stempell 1906
 Class Disporea Cavalier-Smith 1993
 Subclass Unikaryotia Cavalier-Smith 1993
 Subclass Diplokaryotia Cavalier-Smith 1993

See also
 List of Microsporidian genera
 Glugea, a genus of microsporidia
 Nosema apis, a microsporidian parasite of bees

References

External links 

BioHealthBase Bioinformatics Resource Center Database of microspordia sequences and related information.

 

Fungus phyla
Fungi by classification